Jacques Bensimon  (August 26, 1943 – August 26, 2012) was a public film and television director, producer and executive in Canada, working primarily with the National Film Board of Canada (NFB) and TFO, the French-language network of TVOntario.  From 2001 until 2006, he was president of the Cinémathèque québécoise in Montreal.

Career
In 1967, Bensimon began working at the NFB, as a scriptwriter, editor, director and producer. From 1986 to 2000 he was managing director of TFO, where he helped establish partnership and co-production agreements with major distributors all over the world such as the BBC, Arte and France Télévisions. Bensimon was named Government Film Commissioner and Chairperson of the NFB on April 26, 2001 for a five-year term, which was extended for six months and ended on December 17, 2006.

Honours
Bensimon was named a Member of the Order of Canada in 2005, received an honorary doctorate in Letters from York University in Toronto and, in 1998, was named "Chevalier des Arts et des Lettres" from the French Government for what he accomplished at TFO.

Personal life
He was born in Agadir, Morocco, grew up in Montreal after moving to Canada with his family (parents and three sisters) as a teen, and completed his film studies at New York University in New York City. Bensimon worked in Toronto and Montreal. He died in Montreal on August 26, 2012, his 69th birthday.

References

External links

Blog post, biography and playlist at the National Film Board of Canada website

Canadian documentary film directors
Film directors from Montreal
20th-century Canadian civil servants
Tisch School of the Arts alumni
Canadian television executives
20th-century Moroccan Jews
Government Film Commissioners and Chairpersons of the National Film Board of Canada
Moroccan expatriates in Canada
1943 births
2012 deaths
Members of the Order of Canada
Chevaliers of the Ordre des Arts et des Lettres
TVO executives
TFO
Moroccan emigrants to Canada
Jewish Canadian filmmakers